A horizon tank is a large tank built on the coast and used in filmmaking. It allows filmmakers to film an ocean horizon without having to be in the middle of the ocean.

History
The first horizon tank was constructed in Malta in 1964 by special effects technician Benjamin Hole, who later formed Mediterranean Film Studios. Popular films shot there include U-571 and Ridley Scott's White Squall. The studio's tanks are also regularly used for filming TV commercials.

In 1996 20th Century Fox acquired  40 acres of waterfront south of Playas de Rosarito in Baja California, Mexico, and built a 17-million-gallon tank for the film Titanic, a co-production with Paramount Pictures. The tank held a replica of the ship, and provided 270 degrees of ocean view.

List of horizon tanks
There are only a few horizon tanks worldwide:
Mediterranean Film Studios in Malta
Baja Studios in Playas de Rosarito, Baja California, Mexico
Point Cook RAAF Base in Victoria, Australia.
Pinewood Dominican Republic Studios Horizon Water Tank in Juan Dolio, Dominican Republic. 

There are proposals to build new tanks in New Zealand, and at Docklands Studios Melbourne, Australia.

See also
 Infinity edge pool - the same concept for leisure use

References

External links
 Mediterranean Film Studios website

Visual effects